Gilbert Lam Wai San (born 6 July 1962) is a Hong Kong actor formerly with TVB and ATV.

Career
Gilbert Lam joined TVB's actor training course in 1985, but failed to gain an artist contract with TVB. In 1990 he went to Malaysia, appearing in some TV dramas, and became popular in Malaysia. In 1995 he returned to Hong Kong and joined ATV. He became well known for his roles in several ATV dramas, including The Good Old Days (1996), Interpol (1997) and The Mad Phoenix (1999).

Lam joined TVB in 2001, but was unable to land leading roles; in 2004 he returned to ATV. When ATV stopped production of TV dramas, Lam and fellow actors no longer had a role at the station, and he was left with occasionally hosting light entertainment shows.

In 2013 he decided to leave ATV, going north to be cast in mainland Chinese productions.

Filmography

References

1962 births
21st-century Hong Kong male actors
Hong Kong male television actors
TVB actors
Living people
20th-century Hong Kong male actors